Cobre is a ghost town in Elko County, Nevada, United States.

Overview
The town was located at the former interchange point between the Southern Pacific Railroad and the Nevada Northern Railway, and came into being when construction of the Nevada Northern began in 1905.  The Nevada Northern was constructed primarily to serve the copper mines and smelter near Ely, Nevada; cobre is Spanish for "copper." In 1910, Cobre reached its peak population with a total of 60 residents.

A post office was established at Cobre in 1906.  It was discontinued in 1956.

See also

 List of ghost towns in Nevada

References

External links

 Cobre page at ghosttowns.com

Ghost towns in Elko County, Nevada
Populated places established in 1906
Ghost towns in Nevada
1906 establishments in Nevada